Flight 163 may refer to:

Iraqi Airways Flight 163, hijacked on 25 December 1986
Saudia Flight 163, caught fire on 19 August 1980

0163